Basilica di Santa Maria Assunta ( is the principal church in the town of Aquileia, in the Province of Udine and the region of Friuli-Venezia Giulia, Italy. 

The original church dated back to the fourth century. The current basilica was built in the eleventh century and rebuilt again in the thirteenth century. It is located on Via Sacra, overlooking the Piazza del Capitolo, along with the bell tower and baptistery.

Architecture

The façade, in Romanesque-Gothic style, is connected by a portico to the so-called Church of the Pagans, and the remains of the 5th-century baptistery. The interior has a nave and two aisles, with a noteworthy mosaic pavement from the 4th century. The wooden ceiling is from 1526, while the fresco decoration belongs to various ages: from the 4th century in the St. Peter's chapel of the apse area; from the 11th century in the apse itself; from the 12th century in the so-called "Crypt of the Frescoes", under the presbytery, with a cycle depicting the origins of Christianity in Aquileia and the history of St. Hermagoras, first bishop of the city.

Next to the 11th-century Romanesque chapel of the Holy Sepulchre, at the beginning of the left aisle, flooring of different ages can be seen: the lowest is from a Roman villa of the age of Augustus; the middle one has a typical cocciopesto pavement; the upper one, bearing blackening from Attila's fire, has geometrical decorations.

Externally, behind the 9th-century campanile and the apse, is the Cemetery of the Fallen, where ten unnamed soldiers of World War I are buried. Saint Hermagoras is also buried there.

Aquileia
Patriarchate of Aquileia
Aquileia
Aquileia
Basilica churches in Friuli-Venezia Giulia